The Embassy of El Salvador in Washington, D.C. is the diplomatic mission of the  Republic of El Salvador to the United States. It is located at 1400 16th Street Northwest, Suite 100, Washington, D.C. in the Dupont Circle neighborhood.

The embassy also operates consulates-general in Boston, Chicago, Dallas, Houston, Los Angeles, Miami, San Francisco, Santa Ana, and New York City.

The ambassador is Milena Mayorga, who was appointed by president Nayib Bukele on September 24, 2020.

See also
El Salvador–United States relations

References

External links
Official website 
wikimapia

El Salvador
Washington, D.C.
El Salvador–United States relations
Dupont Circle